This is a magazine is an experimental art publication founded in 2002 by Karen ann Donnachie, Andy Simionato & Sons. "One of the best known" flip-book style online magazines it has also published in a variety of formats including a PowerPoint edition, Animated GIF collections as well as video peep-shows and sound-objects. Alongside the internet specific episodes a series of hard-cover printed books or compendia and multi-media projects such as the Everything Will Be OK have been published.

The project is considered "highly influential" in Lauren Parker's Victoria & Albert Museum book on internet publications, Interplay and "a publishing phenomenon" by Adrian Shaughnessy in The UK Journal for Made Images, Varoom.

In an interview for UK magazine Graphics International, New York designer and artist Stefan Sagmeister said "I just think This is a magazine is one of the most interesting publications out there...I followed it from the start and was consistently surprised by its inventiveness"

"Redefining what it means to call something a magazine", This is a magazine'''s editorial style combines artworks by internet artists with found internet ephemera. Over the past decade the project has been exhibited in a number of museums and galleries and has been the subject for publications on art, design, and new media for its ability to move beyond traditional models of curation, publication production, and distribution.

Selected contributing artists

 Miltos Manetas, GR
 Sergei Sviatchenko, DK
 Jodi (art collective), NL
 Angelo Plessas, GR
 Animal Collective, USA
 Brody Condon, USA
 David Shrigley, UK
 Rafa%C3%ABl_Rozendaal, NE
 James Victore, USA
 Jason Salavon, USA
 Jon Burgerman, UK
 Lorna Mills, USA
 Jon Rafman, CA
 Yoshi Sodeoka, JP
 Lia (artist), AT
 Mirko Ilić, USA
 Petra Cortright, USA
 MTAA, USA
 Nadín Ospina, CB
 Pamela Anderson, USA
 Starfuckers, IT
 Antonio Riello, IT

Compendia
 Pink Laser Beam, 2009
 Who I think I am, 2007
 Everything Will Be OK (book) with DVD, 2005
 Chaos Happens, 2004
 Fashionequalsfiction, 2003
 Love, the Universe and Everything, 2002

Exhibitions and conferences
 TDM5 Grafica Italiana, Triennale di Milano Design Museum, Milan, Italy (2012–13)
 Triennale di Milano Design Museum, Milan, Italy (2010)
 Hijacked, Perth Institute of Contemporary Arts, Perth, Australia (2008)
 Colophon 2007, Independent Publication Festival, Luxembourg (2007)
 Reading Room (2005) and Viewing Room (2007), Senko Gallery, Viborg, Denmark
 CMYK — International Trend Magazines Festival, Barcelona, Spain (2004)
 Semi-permanent, Sydney, Australia (2004)
 SignJAM, Milan, Italy (2008)
 ARCO'', Madrid, Spain (2005)

References

External links
Pink Laser Beam
This is a magazine
Everything will be OK
Who I think I am
Donnachie, Simionato & Son (Publishers)
Karen ann Donnachie & Andy Simionato (Founders)
Atomic Activity Books (This is a magazine Imprint)

2002 establishments in Italy
Contemporary art magazines
Design magazines
Fashion magazines
Irregularly published magazines
Magazines established in 2002
Magazines published in Milan
Online magazines
Net.artists